Goblin Valley State Park is a state park of Utah, in the United States. The park features thousands of hoodoos, referred to locally as goblins, which are formations of mushroom-shaped rock pinnacles, some as tall as several yards (meters). The distinct shapes of these rocks result from an erosion-resistant layer of rock atop relatively softer sandstone.

The park lies within the San Rafael Desert on the southeastern edge of the San Rafael Swell, north of the Henry Mountains.

History 

Evidence of Native American cultures, including the Fremont, Paiute, and Ute, is common throughout the San Rafael Swell in the form of pictograph and petroglyph panels. Goblin Valley is noted for several rock art panels, as well as the rock formations. The secluded Goblin Valley was then found by cowboys searching for cattle. Then, in the late 1920s, Arthur Chaffin, later owner/operator of the Hite Ferry, and two companions, were searching for an alternate route between Green River and Caineville. In 1949, Chaffin returned to the area he called Mushroom Valley. He spent several days exploring the mysterious valley and photographing its scores of intricately eroded rocks.

Publicity attracted visitors to the valley despite its remoteness. In 1954, it was proposed that Goblin Valley be protected from vandalism. The state of Utah later acquired the property and established Goblin Valley State Reserve. It was officially designated a state park on August 24, 1964. In 2019, the state park was expanded by adding 6,261 acres of federal land.

2013 vandalism

In October 2013, a delicately balanced hoodoo was intentionally knocked over by a Boy Scout leader while two other men watched, one of whom recorded a video that was later uploaded to the Internet. The men claimed that the hoodoo appeared ready to fall, and that it was intentionally knocked over to prevent park visitors from being hurt. The hoodoo formation had existed for many millions of years, having formed out of rock that dated back as far as 165 million years. The average rate of erosion of a hoodoo is approximately 2–4 feet (0.6-1.3 m) every 100 years.

The two leaders, Glenn Taylor and David Hall, were subsequently dismissed from their leadership roles by the Utah National Parks Council, which is a local council of the Boy Scouts in Utah. The national Boy Scouts then removed the men from the scouting organization altogether. In January 2014, two of the menthe one who toppled the hoodoo and the cameramanwere arraigned on felony charges of "criminal mischief" and "intentionally damaging, defacing and destroying property." The two men pleaded guilty to lesser charges of criminal mischief and attempted criminal mischief, and received a sentence of one year probation plus fines and case-related fees.

Flora and fauna 
The flora of Goblin Valley include Mormon tea, Russian thistle, Indian ricegrass, and various cacti, as well as junipers and pinyon pines at higher elevations.

Fauna include jackrabbits, scorpions, kangaroo rats, pronghorns, kit foxes, midget faded rattlesnakes, and coyotes.

Geology 

The unusual stone shapes in Goblin Valley result from the weathering of Entrada sandstone. The Entrada consists of debris eroded from former highlands and redeposited on a former tidal flat of alternating layers of sandstone, siltstone, and shale. The rocks show evidence of being near the margins of an ancient sea with the ebb and flow of tides, tidal channels that directed currents back to the sea and coastal sand dunes.

Joint or fracture patterns within the Entrada sandstone beds created initial zones of weakness. The unweathered joints intersected to form sharp edges and corners with greater surface-area-to-volume ratios than the faces. As a result, the edges and corners weathered more quickly, producing the spherical-shaped 'goblins'.

The Entrada sandstone from which the hoodoos developed was deposited in the Jurassic period around 170 million years ago.

Climate 

Also, the intermittent summer monsoon arriving from the south can bring intense and localized thunderstorms. The rugged terrain and intense rainfall can lead to devastating flash floods, while the low humidity combined with gusty winds and frequent lightning can spark wildfires.

Film
Goblin Valley was prominently featured in the movie Galaxy Quest (1999) as an alien planet. The eroded sandstone dunes in the valley inspired the design of the fictional planet’s rock monsters.

See also
 Wild Horse Butte

References

External links 

Colorado Plateau
Protected areas of Emery County, Utah
Protected areas established in 1964
Rock formations of Utah
San Rafael Swell
State parks of Utah
1964 establishments in Utah
Landforms of Emery County, Utah